Kulpati is a Sanskrit word for headperson of a lineage. In common English parlance, Chancellor or Rector is sometimes used. "One whose greatness in comparison to others has been recognized or whose undisputed authority is unhesitatingly accepted " In ancient India, the head person of a Gurukul was also called Kulapati. For example, Maharsi Garga was the kulapati of a Gurukul (university). In modern times the post of Kulapati is sometimes a political choice. The general consensus is that Kulapati is a distinguished celebrity who commands respect and reverence from one and all and provides academic leadership to a large educational institution or network.

Notes

References
Sarkar, P.R., Discourses on Neohumanist Education, Ananda Marga Publications,1998, For Section on Kulapati, see pages 188-190.pp. 358

Sanskrit words and phrases